Siena College may refer to:
schools in the United States
 Siena College, a college in Loudonville, New York
 Siena College (Tennessee)
 Siena Heights University in Adrian, Michigan

schools in Australia
 Siena Catholic College in Queensland
 Siena College (Camberwell) in Victoria

schools in the Philippines
 Siena College of Taytay in Rizal province
 Siena College of Quezon City